The Deutsche Wertungszahl (abbreviation: DWZ, ger. German Evaluation Number) is a chess rating system used in Germany. It is an evaluation number in chess to compare the playing performance of individual players. A higher rating number corresponds to a stronger player. A beginner is rated around 500 and a world champion about 2800.

Preface 
The DWZ was introduced by the DSB (Deutscher Schachbund, ger. German Chess Association) after the German reunification in  1990. On January 1, 1993, the DWZ was introduced nationwide and replaced the Ingo-System of the DSB in the Federal Republic of Germany and the NWZ-System of the German Chess Association in East Germany. The DWZ is similar to the Elo rating system of the FIDE, but was enhanced further over the years. In development, the experiences of the Ingo-System and the NWZ-System were respected. The scale goes from about 500 (beginners) to over 2800 (world champions), but is, in theory, open at the top and bottom. The evaluation of the tournaments is done by DWZ-abstractors who transfer the tournament results to the headquarters of the DOSB (Deutscher Olympischer Sportbund, ger. German Olympic Sports Confederation), where the ZDB (Zentrale Wertungsdatenbank, ger. Central Evaluation Database) is administrated. There, a chronological subsequent billing is accomplished according to the finish date of the tournament.

In contrast to the Ingo System, a higher DWZ represents a better playing ability. The DWZ consists of an evaluation number as a measurement of the playing ability and an index number which is separated from that by a "-" sign. For players who do not have a DWZ, but have a FIDE-ELO, the FIDE-ELO is used, marked with the index 6 and resumed as DWZ. For players who neither have a DWZ nor a FIDE-ELO, but have a national evaluation number, this number is used and translated if necessary. In this case the index is set to zero.

Calculating the DWZ 
The basic curve for calculation is the Gauss error distribution curve. For calculation, an integral is necessary to determine the expectation of winnings. Only chess results against competitors with a DWZ are taken into account.

Basic formula 
The DWZ is calculated in the following way:

Z0: present DWZ
Zn: new DWZ
W: achieved points
We: expected points
n: number of finished games
E: development coefficient

Expected and achieved points 
The achieved points W are the sum of the game results in which a win counts 1 point, a draw counts ½ point, and a defeat 0 points. The expected points We are calculated with the following approximation:

ZA: present DWZ
ZG: present DWZ of the competitor

The expected points are calculated for each game of chess and then added. The exact values of the expected points can be looked at in the table of the DSB. The formula provides good approximations.

The development coefficient 
Another constituent is the development coefficient E. It consists of the fundamental value E0, the acceleration factor a and the braking value B:

with

The component J depends on the age of the player.

teenagers up to 20 years: J = 5,
junior adults (21 – 25 years): J = 10,
over-25-year-olds: J = 15

For the acceleration factor a it is claimed: It cannot be higher than 1 or lower than 0.5. Furthermore, it is only calculated if the player is less than 20 years old and has achieved more points than expected. The acceleration factor a is 1 if that is not the case. The acceleration factor helps young players to improve their DWZs more quickly.

The braking value B is only calculated for players with a DWZ of under 1300 points and only if the achieved points are less or equal to the expected ones, else the braking value is zero. The braking value makes the DWZ of poor players decrease not so rapidly.

Besides, E depends on the number of the previously evaluated tournaments. The index i is 1 in the first DWZ and is increased by 1 after every tournament evaluation.

Also consider that:

This formula is only considered when a DWZ already exists, viz. i is not only zero. So E is normally increased to 5, if the coefficient is less than five, or decreased to thirty if E is higher than 30. If a braking factor is present (B>0), E can also go beyond 30.

The next step is to round E to the nearest integer.

How to determine the first DWZ 
To determine the first DWZ the basic formula may not be applied. With the ratio of points in percent and the probability table, the differential DWZ is determined. To this value the average DWZ of the competitors is added and the result is the first DWZ.

DWZ values table

See also
 Chess rating system
 Elo rating system

External links
 An unofficial DWZ-Calculator, working with the table values of the DSB 
 Rules for the evaluation of the chess players' skills in Germany 
 DWZ search interface of the DSB 
 Components of the DWZ formula 
 Calculating the estimated result 
 Table of the estimated result 
 Calculating the new DWZ 

Chess rating systems
Chess in Germany
1993 in chess